Şahkərəm (also, Shakhkerem) is a village in the Dashkasan Rayon of Azerbaijan.  The village forms part of the municipality of Qaraqullar.

References 

Populated places in Dashkasan District